HMS Mermaid was a  sixth-rate frigate of the Royal Navy. She was first commissioned in April 1761 under Captain George Watson and built in Blaydes Yard in Kingston-Upon-Hull.

On 8 July 1778, the 50 gun Sagittaire and the 64-gun Fantasque forced HMS Mermaid to beach herself at Cape Henhlopen.

Notes

References

 Robert Gardiner, The First Frigates, Conway Maritime Press, London 1992. .
 
 David Lyon, The Sailing Navy List, Conway Maritime Press, London 1993. .
 Rif Winfield, British Warships in the Age of Sail, 1714 to 1792, Seaforth Publishing, London 2007. .

External links
 

 

1761 ships
Sixth-rate frigates of the Royal Navy
Maritime incidents in 1778